Chen Xi (born 16 September 1953) is a Chinese politician currently serving as the head of the Organization Department of the Chinese Communist Party (CCP) and president of the Central Party School. Between 2017 and 2022, Chen has was a member of the Politburo of the CCP and a secretary of the Secretariat of the CCP. A graduate from Tsinghua University, Chen served as the party chief of the institution from 2002 to 2008. Thereafter he served as a vice-minister of education and vice chairman of the China Association for Science and Technology.

Early career 
Chen traces his ancestry to Putian, Fujian province, and was born in the provincial capital Fuzhou. He worked in his youth at a mechanics factory attached to Fuzhou University. Shortly after the resumption of higher education at the end of the Cultural Revolution, Chen was recommended to attend Tsinghua University as a "Worker-Peasant-Soldier student", where he earned a bachelor's degree. At Tsinghua he was friends with Xi Jinping, who was also attending Tsinghua at the time.

Chen joined the Communist Party in November 1978. After graduating from Tsinghua he returned to Fuzhou University to become a lecturer. In September 1979 he headed back to Tsinghua where he completed a Master's of Science degree. He stayed at Tsinghua to work for the Communist Party and its affiliated Youth League as a political organizer. Between 1990 and 1992 he went on a stint at Stanford University as a visiting scholar. Beginning in August 1993, he became the deputy chief of the party organization at Tsinghua, becoming executive deputy chief two years later. In 2002 he became head of the Tsinghua party organization.

In November 2008, Chen became Vice Minister of Education, leaving his post at Tsinghua shortly thereafter. In September 2010, Chen was sent to Liaoning to serve as Deputy Communist Party Secretary of the province, where he served for a mere seven months. In April 2011 Chen became the head of the party branch and vice chairman of the China Association for Science and Technology (CAST), succeeding Deng Nan.

Rise to prominence
In April 2013, following the ascension of Xi Jinping to the posts of General Secretary and President, Chen left his post at CAST and was transferred to become executive deputy head of the Organization Department of the Chinese Communist Party. Chen is widely seen as a confidant and ally of Xi Jinping.

At the 19th Party Congress, Chen was named head of the Organization Department of the Chinese Communist Party, placed in charge of party personnel. As was customary for an Organization Department head, he was given a seat on the 19th Politburo of the Chinese Communist Party. Unusually, however, Chen Xi broke nearly thirty years of party precedent by becoming the president of the Central Party School without holding a seat on the Politburo Standing Committee. While this was seen as a "demotion" of the status of the Central Party School, it was also seen as an elevation of Chen Xi's position.

Chen is a member of the 19th Central Committee of the Chinese Communist Party, and was a member of the 16th and 17th Central Commissions for Discipline Inspection. Beginning in 2013, he also was a member of the Central Leading Group for Inspection Work.

References 

Members of the 19th Politburo of the Chinese Communist Party
Tsinghua University alumni
Politicians from Fuzhou
Chinese Communist Party politicians from Fujian
1953 births
People's Republic of China politicians from Fujian
Living people
Academic staff of Fuzhou University